Norman Case may refer to:

 Norman S. Case (1888–1967), Rhode Island politician
 Norman Case (footballer) (1925–1973), English footballer